Doumbe, Doumbé or N'Doumbé is the surname of the following people
Cedric Doumbe (born 1992), Cameroonian kickboxer 
Cédric N'Doumbé (born 1990), Cameroonian football player
François N'Doumbé (born 1954), Cameroonian footballer player
Jean-Joël Perrier-Doumbé (born 1978), French-born Cameroonian football player
Mathias Kouo-Doumbé (born 1979), French football player

See also
Doumbé F.C., a Togolese football club

French-language surnames